Galera Airfield is an abandoned military airfield in the Umbria region of central Italy, 5.3 km south-southwest of Umbertide.

Its last known use was by the United States Army Air Force Twelfth Air Force in 1944 during the Italian Campaign. Today, the site of the airfield is indistinguishable from the many agricultural fields in the area.

References

 Maurer, Maurer. Air Force Combat Units of World War II. Maxwell AFB, Alabama: Office of Air Force History, 1983. .

External links

Airfields of the United States Army Air Forces in Italy
Italy in World War II
Aviation in Italy
Airports established in 1943